Mel, Mels or MEL may refer to:

Biology
 Mouse erythroleukemia cell line (MEL)
 National Herbarium of Victoria, a herbarium with the Index Herbariorum code MEL

People
 Mel (given name), the abbreviated version of several given names (including a list of people with the name)
 Mel (surname)
 Manuel Zelaya, former president of Honduras, nicknamed "Mel"

Places
 Mel, Veneto, an ex-comune in Italy
 Mel Moraine, a moraine in Antarctica
 Melbourne Airport (IATA airport code)
 Mels, a municipality in Switzerland
Métropole Européenne de Lille (MEL), the intercommunality of Lille in France

Technology and engineering
 Maya Embedded Language, a scripting language used in the 3D graphics program Maya
 Michigan eLibrary, an online service of the Library of Michigan
 Ford MEL engine, a "Mercury-Edsel-Lincoln" engine series 
 Minimum equipment list, a categorized list of instruments and equipment on an aircraft
 Miscellaneous electric load, the electricity use of appliances, electronics and other small electric devices in buildings

Arts and entertainment 
 Mel (film), a 1998 film with Ernest Borgnine
 Mel (album), a 1979 album by Maria Bethânia
 Portal Stories: Mel, a mod of the video game Portal 2

Other uses 
 Mel languages, spoken in western Africa
 Mel scale, a scale for measuring auditory pitches as perceived by the human ear
 Midland Expressway Ltd, operator of the UK M6 Toll road
 Musical Electronics Library, a lending library of homemade electronic musical devices in New Zealand
 Mullard Equipment Limited, a former British electronics company
 Minimum Equipment List, a regulation for airplanes - see Master minimum equipment list
 Mel, an online magazine published by Dollar Shave Club
 Honey, as often shown in ingredients with its Latin name

See also

 Mel's (disambiguation)
 Mad Mel (disambiguation)
 Melvin Purvis (1903–1960), American law enforcement official nicknamed "Little Mel"
 Mels
 Mell (disambiguation)